Pope Michael IV of Alexandria, also known as Khail IV, 68th Pope of Alexandria and Patriarch of the See of St. Mark.

He was initially a monk at the Monastery of Saint Macarius the Great in Scetes. He later went to a place near Singar, where he lived in a cave for more than 20 years. On 12 Paopi, 809 A.M. (9 October 1092 AD), he was ordained Pope of Alexandria. He was known for his love of the poor and needy, and for spending the church money on paying the Jizya for those Copts who could not afford to pay it, so that they could keep their Christianity.

The Arabic historian al-Makin is quoted by later historians as recounting that Pope Michael IV made a journey to Ethiopia to ask that country's Emperor to allow the Nile to flood to its normal levels, which would end the current famine. Trimingham dismisses this as only a legend.

Michael IV departed on 30 Pashons, 818 A.M. (25 May 1102 AD) He remained on the Throne of Saint Mark for 9 years, 7 months, and 17 days.

Notes

Coptic Orthodox saints
1102 deaths
12th-century Christian saints
11th-century Coptic Orthodox popes of Alexandria
Year of birth unknown
12th-century Coptic Orthodox popes of Alexandria